Esmeralda is a 1922 British silent film and an adaptation of the 1831 novel The Hunchback of Notre-Dame by Victor Hugo, with more emphasis on the character on Esmeralda rather than Quasimodo. It was directed by Edwin J. Collins (who played the hunchback in the previous 1911 film The Hunchback (not to be confused with the novel by Hugo)) and starred Sybil Thorndike as Esmeralda and Booth Conway as the hunchback. The film is considered lost, but extant still photos show a 40-year-old Thorndike who appears to be too old for the role of the young and virginal Esmeralda. This version emphasized romance and melodrama over horror.

The film was remade again in 1923 as The Hunchback of Notre Dame by Universal Pictures, starring Lon Chaney as Quasimodo, in what is considered the classic silent film version.

Cast
 Sybil Thorndike as Esmeralda
 Booth Conway as Quasimodo
 Annesley Healy as Claude Frollo
 Arthur Kingsley as Captain Phoebus

References

External links
 

1922 films
Silent historical romance films
British silent short films
British black-and-white films
British romantic drama films
Films based on The Hunchback of Notre-Dame
1922 romantic drama films
1920s historical romance films
Films set in Paris
Films set in religious buildings and structures
Films set in the 1480s
British historical romance films
Films about Romani people
1920s British films
Silent romantic drama films
Silent horror films
1920s English-language films